The 1954–55 Magyar Kupa (English: Hungarian Cup) was the 23rd season of Hungary's annual knock-out cup football competition.

Round 1 
In the event of a tie, the away team advanced.

 The Hunyai SK - Szegedi Haladás match was canceled because the number of the home team was not enough at the beginning.
 The Hungarian Cotton Weaver - Szolnok Kinizsi missed, the Nyírád Miner - Ercsi Kinizsi 4 - 2 results were canceled because Szolnok and Nyírád did not have valid sports doctor licenses.
 The results of the Pécs Locomotive - Dombóvár Locomotive 6 - 3 were canceled because Pécs included two unlicensed players.

|-
|colspan="3"  align="center" style="background:#fcc;"|12. february 1955.

|-
|colspan="3"  align="center" style="background:#fcc;"|13. february 1955.

|}

Round  2. 

|-
|colspan="3"  align="center" style="background:#fcc;"|1955. február 20.

|}

Round 3. 

|-
|colspan="3"  align="center" style="background:#fcc;"|10. April 1955.

|-
|colspan="3"  align="center" style="background:#fcc;"|8. May 1955.

|-
|colspan="3"  align="center" style="background:#fcc;"|26. May 1955.

|-
|colspan="3"  align="center" style="background:#fcc;"|22. Jun 1955.

|}

Quarterfinals 

|-
|colspan="3"  align="center" style="background:#fcc;"|22. Jun 1955.

|-
|colspan="3"  align="center" style="background:#fcc;"|30. July 1955.

|-
|colspan="3"  align="center" style="background:#fcc;"|13. August 1955.

|}

Semifinals 

|-
|colspan="3"  align="center" style="background:#fcc;"|13. August 1955

|-
|colspan="3"  align="center" style="background:#fcc;"|17. August 1955
|-

|-
|}

Final

See also
 1954 Nemzeti Bajnokság I

References

External links
 Official site 
 soccerway.com

1954–55 in Hungarian football
1954–55 domestic association football cups
1954-55